Miśkiewicz is a Polish surname. People with this surname include:
Dorota Miśkiewicz (b. 1973), Polish singer
Michał Miśkiewicz (b. 1989), Polish footballer
Tomasz Miśkiewicz (b. 1977), Muslim religious leader in Poland

See also
Adam Mickiewicz, Polish-Lithuanian Romantic poet
Michal Misiewicz, Polish-Canadian footballer

Polish-language surnames